The Hoosier Heartland Conference is an IHSAA-Sanctioned Athletic Conference in North Central Indiana. It comprises mainly single A and smaller AA schools.  Lafayette Central Catholic joined the Hoosier Athletic Conference after the 2010–11 school year, and was replaced by Sheridan, who joined 2012. With the major conference realignment in Indiana in 2015, the conference picked up four schools from neighboring conferences that were folding, as well as a football-only member to balance the new football divisions. However, with the Midwest Conference reforming, the conference will be down to eight schools (seven in football) for the 2018–19 school year, as Delphi will rejoin the conference in 2019.

Membership

 Delphi played in the HAC from 1998 to December 17, 2015, when it was removed from the conference, and played as an Independent until rejoining the HHC. Since the departure happened in the middle of the school year instead of during the summer, the exit date is listed as 2016, since the school completed the fall season sports as conference members.

Former Members

Former Football-Only Member

Divisions 2015-18

State Champions
IHSAA State Champions

Carroll Cougars (1)
 1995 Football (A)

Clinton Prairie Gophers (6)
 1984 Volleyball
 1997 Volleyball (A)
 1998 Volleyball (A)
 1999 Girls' Basketball (A)
 2002 Softball (A)
 2005 Softball (A)

Rossville Hornets (2)
 2000 Baseball (A)
 2002 Boys' Basketball (A)

Tri-Central Trojans (4)
 2003 Girls' Basketball (A)
 2004 Girls' Basketball (A)
 2005 Girls' Basketball (A)
 2013 Football (A)

Taylor Titans (1)
2000 Boys Baseball (2A)

References

External links
IHSAA Conference Membership
Indiana High School Athletic Association

Indiana high school athletic conferences
High school sports conferences and leagues in the United States